Scillavone B is a homoisoflavone that can be isolated from the bulbs of Scilla scilloides (Barnardia japonica).

References

External links 
 Scillavone B at kanaya.naist.jp/knapsack_jsp
 Scillavone B at ctdbase.org

Homoisoflavonoids
O-methylated natural phenols